Yosemite Sam(/joʊˈsɛmɪti/ yoh-SEM-ih-tee) is the nickname given by DXers to a rumored numbers station that was heard making intermittent broadcasts between December 19, 2004 and February 16, 2005. It transmitted on several shortwave frequencies in dual side band: 3700 kHz, 4300 kHz, 6500 kHz, and 10500 kHz.  The nickname is taken from the Warner Bros. Cartoons character Yosemite Sam, whose voice was always played as part of the unusual transmission.

The broadcast series
The broadcast began on one of the frequencies stated above. Ten seconds later, it was repeated on the next higher frequency, and so on for a total of two minutes.  The entire pattern took precisely two minutes, and always began seven seconds after the top of an hour. Each broadcast started with a data burst lasting 0.8 seconds, followed by the voice of Yosemite Sam (played by voice actor Mel Blanc) exclaiming: "Varmint, I'm a-gonna b-b-b-bloooow ya ta'smithereenies!"  The clip is taken from Bunker Hill Bunny (1950).

The initial broadcasts only lasted from December 19 to December 23, 2004. They subsequently returned almost one month later on January 14, 2005, on the old frequencies plus additional new frequencies, including those of time signals stations WWV and WWVH. Reception reports seemed to indicate that the transmitter site was likely somewhere in the desert around Albuquerque, New Mexico.

Source discovery
Since 3700kHz is in the 80-meter band used by amateur radio enthusiasts, the appearance of an unauthorized and anonymous wide-band signal attracted the attention of many ham operators (amateur radio operators) from across the country, leading to speculation that it was a type of numbers station. In February 2005, two ham operators from New Mexico successfully used mobile radio triangulation equipment to track the signal to the Laguna Pueblo reservation west of Albuquerque, and more precisely to the Mobility Assessment Test & Integration Center (MATIC), a radio test site owned and operated by military contractor Laguna Industries. In a 2003 news article, MATIC was described as a "32,000-square-mile range" intended to "test frequencies, radios and other aspects of communications networks, using the mesas and hills around Laguna Pueblo to simulate battlefield conditions for short-range radio equipment."

On the afternoon of February 16, the investigating hams reached the outer perimeter of MATIC and began taking photographs of a compound containing buildings, towers and antennae, but they quickly fled when they were approached by an angry security guard. Three hours later, the radio broadcasts abruptly ceased, and have not been heard since. Laguna Industries also removed all references to MATIC from their official website; despite this, MATIC itself has continued to operate as a government-controlled RF test and training range as late as 2009, having performed airborne tests of a 12-lb "micro UAV" for Honeywell in 2005 and tests of a vehicle-mounted directed energy weapon (described in documents as a microwave-based "prototype engine stopper") for the US Department of Justice in April 2009.

See also
 Numbers station

References

External links
 "Yosemite Sam" at Spynumbers.com Includes a recording of the station
 "Yosemite Sam" at the Global Frequency Database
 "Ham vs Spy (radio)" (Archived version on archive.org) Transmitter site pinpointed
 Glenn Hauser's World of Radio DX LISTENING DIGEST 5-039, March 4, 2005 on Yosemite Sam and the link with MATIC Center

Shortwave radio stations
Secret broadcasting